Butyrivibrio hungatei is a species of Gram-negative, anaerobic, non-spore-forming, butyrate-producing  bacteria. It is curved rod-shaped and motile by means of single polar or subpolar flagellum and is common in the rumen. Its type strain is JK 615T (=DSM 14810T =ATCC BAA-456T).

References

Further reading

Mrazek, J., et al. "Diet-dependent shifts in ruminal butyrate-producing bacteria."Folia microbiologica 51.4 (2006): 294-298. 
Stack, ROBERT J. "Neutral sugar composition of extracellular polysaccharides produced by strains of Butyrivibrio fibrisolvens." Applied and Environmental Microbiology 54.4 (1988): 878–883.

External links
LPSN
Type strain of Butyrivibrio hungatei at BacDive -  the Bacterial Diversity Metadatabase

Lachnospiraceae
Gut flora bacteria
Bacteria described in 2003